The Akademie Waldschlösschen (Waldschlösschen Academy) is an education and conference center near Reinhausen in Lower Saxony, between Göttingen and Heiligenstadt.

Building and history

In 1981, the Academy founders took possession of an unused historic building originally constructed as the Waldschlösschen Spa Hotel in 1904. Once the building was repurposed, it was named Freies Tagungshaus Waldschlösschen (Waldschlösschen Independent Conference Center) and then, in 2000, renamed Akademie Waldschlösschen.

Due to the fall of the Berlin Wall in 1989 and the opening of the inner German border located just five kilometers to the east of Reinhausen, the Waldschlösschen is now in Germany's geographic center. The landmarked building was expanded in 1990 and 2008 by the construction of annexes for meeting space and accommodations.

Since 2000, the Academy has been accredited as a Heimvolkshochschule (residential institution for continuing adult education) under the terms of Niedersächsisches Erwachsenenbildungsgesetz (the law concerning adult education in Lower Saxony). This status leads to a dedicated budget line within the annual state budget, in the same manner as Lower Saxony's 22 other accredited Heimvolkshochschulen. In 2003, founders Rainer Marbach and Ulli Klaum established the Waldschlösschen Academy Charitable Trust, which continues to oversee the Academy.

Mission

Although the work of the Akademie Waldschlösschen has not been limited to gays and lesbians as target groups, it was primarily founded as a "gay adult education center", which reflects its origins in the German gay movement of the 1970s. Since then it has developed into a national center for networking among and training of activist LGBT*I* workers (e.g., of teachers, lawyers, clergy, gay fathers, and gay, gaylesbian, and queer university student groups, many in cooperation with Trans*Aktiv and Intersexuelle Menschen e.V.). The history of the German gay movement is unimaginable without the Waldschlösschen. Ralf König has mentioned it several times in his books, for example, as the setting of Beach Boys (Rowohlt 1989).

The queer self-concept of the Akademie Waldschlösschen, developed from a critique of heteronormativity, is informed by the idea "that identities, norms, and values are not self-evident or natural, but are based on social factors and must be seen as constructed, in need of reconsideration and renegotiation." The work of the academy “is based on:

	the conviction that all humans are equal and can participate in the shared process of influencing and shaping society,
	respect for the diversity and variability of lifestyles and sexualities,
	solidarity with those who experience ostracism and discrimination,
	challenging the predominance of heteronormativity,
	a firm belief in the importance of self-organizing and taking personal responsibility."

The Academy is of similar significance for AIDS work in Germany. Facing the many challenges of the AIDS crisis of the 1980s, the Waldschlösschen undertook a nationwide linking of the different AIDS support initiatives. This led to the founding of the national Deutsche AIDS-Hilfe, which has been a frequent collaborator ever since.

The Waldschlösschen is also significant in that it has developed advanced training courses for both professional and volunteer staff members of the Deutsche AIDS-Hilfe in addition to providing education and supporting the networking and self-management of people with HIV and AIDS from all communities. Rita Süssmuth, a former president of the German Federal Parliament and former Federal Minister for Family Affairs, Women, Youth, and Health, has been quoted as saying, "To me the Waldschlösschen is important because individuals affected by AIDS receive vital support. People can network, which makes a decisive contribution to a positive way of life." A visible expression of grief for the victims of AIDS and a further sign of solidarity is the artwork Names and Stones, a "thinking space" installation in the outdoor area of the Academy that displays the names of those who have died. It is updated yearly.

Educational program

"The Akademie Waldschlösschen stands for the acceptance of sexual and gender diversity and supports the visibility and participation of such groups in society through education and networking. Working with an intersectional approach serves to strengthen the self-confidence, gender self-determination, and identities of those involved, and provides an open space for reflecting on its historical and social conditionality. This leads to an inevitable, broader opportunity to scrutinize the prevailing heteronormativity and its resulting inequalities in our society."

As part of its educational mission, the Akademie Waldschlösschen cooperates with individuals, groups, and networks which actively engage against homo-, trans*- and interphobia, as well as racism and hostility toward immigrants. Initiating and supporting self-help and interlinking civil and social structures are important aspects of this mission. In-service training – especially for those in social professions (e.g., those working with people with disabilities, homophobia in sports, and gender diversity education) – are part of the program.

The workshop program of the Akademie Waldschlösschen is aimed at multiple demographics. There are offerings in areas such as "social activism and self-help", "daily living and health", "science, art, and language" as well as "diversity and ethics in the workplace". Offerings are targeted in particular:

	to those with gay, lesbian, bisexual, and queer ways of living,
	for people with HIV and AIDS and their partners,
	toward qualification of volunteer work, especially for those who work against homophobia and actively engage in AIDS-help work,
	in support of an examination of scientific research regarding the main priorities of the Academy."

Through the pilot project 'Akzeptanz für Vielfalt – gegen Homo-, Trans*- und Inter*feindlichkeit' ('Acceptance of diversity – against homo-, trans*- and interphobia') included in the broader federal project 'Demokratie leben!' ('Living democracy!', running since 2015), the Academy's aspiration is one of macrosocial alliance for acceptance of diversity – beginning in Lower Saxony, but ultimately as a movement nationwide.

The Akademie Waldschlösschen hosts numerous guest conferences alongside its own workshops, primarily in cooperation with universities, public agencies, and social institutions. Prior to the coronavirus pandemic, approximately 6,000 participants in 300 workshops visited the Academy each year, resulting in 15,000 overnight stays.

Charitable Trust Board

Members of the Akademie Waldschlösschen Board of Directors include the founders Rainer Marbach and Ulli Klaum.

The Board of Trustees consists of Silke Eggers (chair), Stefan Reiss (vice chair), Michael Bochow, Monika Börding, Klaus Müller, Joachim Schulte, Klaus Stehling, Renate Steinhoff, Thomas Wilde, Carsten Schatz, and – appointed as liaison with the German AIDS-Hilfe – Winfried Holz, with non-voting attendee Hans Hengelein serving as host.

Selected publications

Since 1999 the Academy has published two series: the Edition Waldschlösschen (19 volumes as of the end of 2021, with Männerschwarm Verlag) and, with its own Waldschlösschen imprint, the Edition Waldschlösschen – Materialien (20 volumes as of the end of 2020), which comprises books and booklets that primarily document and assemble materials from the institution's educational events.

 Jean Jacques Soukup (eds.): Die DDR. Der Aufbruch. Die Schwulen. Versuch einer Bestandaufnahme. Verein für Soziale und Pädagogische Arbeit, 1990, .
 Michael Bochow, Rainer Marbach (eds.): Islam und Homosexualität. Koran / Islamische Länder / Situation in Deutschland. MännerschwarmSkript-Verlag, 2003, .
 Lüder Tietz (ed.): Homosexualität verstehen. Kritische Konzepte für die psychologische und pädagogische Praxis. MännerschwarmSkript-Verlag, 2004, .
 Michael Bochow: Ich bin doch schwul und will das immer bleiben. Schwule Männer im dritten Lebensalter. MännerschwarmSkript-Verlag, 2005, .
 Volker Weiss:: … mit ärztlicher Hilfe zum richtigen Geschlecht? Zur Kritik der medizinischen Konstruktion der Transsexualität. MännerschwarmSkript-Verlag, 2009, .
 Andreas Pretzel, Volker Weiss (eds.): Ohnmacht und Aufbegehren. Homosexuelle Männer in der frühen Bundesrepublik. Geschichte der Homosexuellen in Deutschland nach 1945, vol 1. Männerschwarm Verlag, 2010, .
 Michael Bochow, Andreas Pretzel (eds.): Ich wollte es so normal wie andere auch. Walter Guttmann erzählt sein Leben. Männerschwarm Verlag, 2011, .
 Andreas Pretzel, Volker Weiss (eds.): Rosa Radikale. Die Schwulenbewegung der 1970er Jahre. Geschichte der Homosexuellen in Deutschland nach 1945, vol. 2. Männerschwarm Verlag, 2012, .
 Volker Weiß, Bodo Niendel (eds.): Queer zur Norm. Leben jenseits einer schwulen oder lesbischen Identität." Männerschwarm Verlag, 2012, .
 Andreas Pretzel, Volker Weiss (eds.): Zwischen Autonomie und Integration. Schwule Politik und Schwulenbewegung in den 1980er und 1990er Jahren. Geschichte der Homosexuellen in Deutschland nach 1945, vol. 3. Männerschwarm Verlag, 2013, .
 Rainer Marbach, Volker Weiss (eds.): Konformitäten und Konfrontationen. Homosexuelle in der DDR. Geschichte der Homosexuellen in Deutschland nach 1945, vol. 4. Männerschwarm Verlag, 2017, .
 Andreas Pretzel, Volker Weiss (eds.): Politiken in Bewegung. Die Emanzipation Homosexueller im 20. Jahrhundert. Geschichte der Homosexuellen in Deutschland nach 1945, vol. 5. Männerschwarm Verlag, 2017, .
 Carolin Küppers, Rainer Marbach (eds.): Communities, Camp und Camouflage. Bewegung in Kunst und Kultur. Geschichte der Homosexuellen in Deutschland nach 1945, vol. 6. Männerschwarm Verlag, 2017, .
 Carolin Küppers, Martin Schneider (eds.): Orte der Begegnung, Orte des Widerstands. Zur Geschichte homosexueller, trans*geschlechtlicher und queerer Räume. Geschichte der Homosexuellen in Deutschland nach 1945, vol. 7. Männerschwarm Verlag, Salzgeber Buchverlage, 2018, .
 Ines Pohlkamp, Kevin Rosenberger. Akzeptanz für Vielfalt von klein auf! Sexuelle und geschlechtliche Vielfalt in Kinderbüchern. Ein Rezensionsband für pädagogische Fachkräfte in Kindertagesstätten. Materialien, no. 18. Waldschlösschen Verlag, 2018.
 Carolin Vierneisel (ed.). Queeres Lehren und Lernen an lehramtsbildenden Hochschulen. Verortungen und Impulse im Rahmen der Arbeit der Forschungs- und Netzwerkstelle Vielfalt Lehren! Materialien, no. 19. Waldschlösschen Verlag, 2019.
 Karsten Nietzschmann et al. Vielfalts*bezogenene Perspektiven und Erfahrungen von Dozierenden im Lehramtsstudium in Sachsen und Oldenburg. Bericht zu den Ergebnissen der Forschungs- und Netzwerkstelle Vielfalt Lehren! Materialien, no. 20. Waldschlösschen Verlag, 2019.
 Carolin Küppers, Martin Schneider (eds.): Zwischen Annäherung und Abgrenzung. Religion und LSBTIQ* in gesellschaftlicher Debatte und persönlichem Erleben. Geschichte der Homosexuellen in Deutschland nach 1945, vol. 8. Männerschwarm Verlag, 2021, .
 Stephan Baglikow, Kim Alexandra Trau (eds.): Wurzeln – Bande – Flügel. Familie als Ort der Sozialisation, Kontrolle und Emanzipation. Geschichte der Homosexuellen in Deutschland nach 1945, vol. 9. Männerschwarm Verlag, 2021, .

 References 

 Bibliography 
 Rainer Marbach (ed.) Waldschlösschen mittendrin. Ein Lesebuch. MännerschwarmSkript-Verlag, 2006, .
 Georg Etscheit. "Mitten in der Provinz. Die Akademie Waldschlösschen ist die einzige staatlich anerkannte Bildungsstätte für Schwule und Lesben", Die Zeit'', no. 1, 28 December 2006, p. 69.

External links 

 Official website

LGBT history in Germany
LGBT culture in Germany
Schools in Lower Saxony